Milap Chand Jain (21 July 1929-29 April 2015) was the former Chief Justice of the Rajasthan High Court.

He was born in 1929 in Jodhpur, Rajasthan. After obtaining his B. Com. and LLM degrees, he was appointed a judge of the Rajasthan High Court in 1978, and he later rose to become the Chief Justice. He was also the chairman of the Jain Commission set up by the Government of India to inquire into Rajiv Gandhi's assassination.

References 

20th-century Indian judges
Governors of Rajasthan
Rajasthani people
1929 births
2015 deaths
People from Jodhpur
Chief Justices of the Rajasthan High Court
Assassination of Rajiv Gandhi
Indian Peace Keeping Force